Kalateh-ye Molla may refer to:
 Kalateh-ye Molla, Gonabad, Razavi Khorasan Province
 Kalateh-ye Molla, Zaveh, Razavi Khorasan Province
 Kalateh-ye Molla, Damghan, Semnan Province
 Kalateh-ye Molla, Meyami, Semnan Province
 Kalateh-ye Molla, alternate name of Dehmolla, Semnan Province
 Kalateh-ye Molla, South Khorasan

See also
 Kalateh-ye Molla Aziz
 Kalateh-ye Molla Gholamhoseyn
 Kalateh-ye Molla Khodadad
 Kalateh-ye Molla Mohammad
 Kalateh-ye Molla Veys